O-1871 is a potent cannabinoid agonist which was invented by Billy R Martin and Raj K Razdan at Organix Inc in 2002. It has a CB1 receptor affinity of 2.0nM and a CB2 receptor affinity of 0.3nM. Structurally, O-1871 is a cyclohexylphenol derivative related to CP 47,497, and so is illegal in some jurisdictions where CP 47,497 and its derivatives are banned. However the 3,3-dimethylcyclohexyl substituent of O-1871 can be replaced by various other groups, producing other potent compounds such as the cycloheptyl derivative O-1656 and the 2-adamantyl derivative O-1660, as well as the corresponding 3,5-dichlorophenyl derivative, which are not cyclohexylphenol derivatives.

See also
 CP 55,940
 Cannabidiol
 Cannabicyclohexanol
 Cannabinor

References

Cannabinoids
2,6-Dihydroxybiphenyls